Pablo Martinez (born 21 February 1989) is a French professional footballer who plays as a defender.

Club career
After years in the French lower divisions, Martinez joined Gazélec Ajaccio in June 2013, while the club was in the third division. He made his full professional debut a year-later, in a Ligue 2 victory over Valenciennes.

In June 2016, free agent Martinez joined Angers SCO on a three-year contract.

In June 2019, Martinez moved to Nîmes Olympique on a free transfer having agreed on a three-year contract.

Personal life
Martinez is of Spanish descent.

Honours 
Strasbourg
 Coupe de la Ligue: 2018–19

References

External links
 
 
 Pablo Martinez foot-national.com Profile

1989 births
Living people
People from Martigues
Sportspeople from Bouches-du-Rhône
Association football defenders
French footballers
French people of Spanish descent
Ligue 1 players
Ligue 2 players
Championnat National players
FC Martigues players
ES Uzès Pont du Gard players
Gazélec Ajaccio players
Angers SCO players
RC Strasbourg Alsace players
Nîmes Olympique players
Footballers from Provence-Alpes-Côte d'Azur